In the 2000–01 season Panathinaikos played for 42nd consecutive time in Greece's top division, Alpha Ethniki. They also competed in the UEFA Champions League and the Greek Cup.

Squad

Competitions

Alpha Ethniki

Classification

UEFA Champions League

Qualifying phase

Third qualifying round

First group stage

Group E

Second group stage

Group A

Notes

References

External links
 Panathinaikos FC official website

Panathinaikos F.C. seasons
Panathinaikos